Best Night Ever may refer to:

Best Night Ever, a 2013 American found footage comedy film written and directed by Jason Friedberg and Aaron Seltzer
"Best Night Ever" (song), song by American country band Gloriana
"The Best Night Ever", an episode of My Little Pony: Friendship Is Magic